The 22309 / 10 Howrah–New Jalpaiguri AC Express was a AC Superfast Express train belonging to Indian Railways – Eastern Railway zone that ran between Howrah Junction (Kolkata) and New Jalpaiguri (Siliguri) in India.

It operated as train number 22309 from Howrah to New Jalpaiguri and as train number 22310 in the reverse direction, serving the states of West Bengal and Bihar.

Eastern Railway cancelled its operations permanently from 19 May 2020.

Coaches

The 22309 / 10 Howrah–New Jalpaiguri AC Express had 6 AC 3 tier, 11 AC Chair Car & 2 End-on Generator coaches . It did not carry a pantry car .

Service

Despite the average speed of the train being below , as per Indian Railways rules, its fare included a Superfast surcharge.

Routeing

The 22309 / 10 Howrah–New Jalpaiguri AC Express ran from Howrah Junction to New Jalpaiguri (Siliguri). The intermediate stations and stoppage time were as follows-
 Howrah (starts)
  (2 minutes)
  (2 minutes)
  (10 minutes)
  (2 minutes)
New Jalpaiguri (Siliguri) (ends)

Traction
As the route is fully electrified, this train ran on electric traction Howrah WAP-7.

Operation

22309 Howrah–New Jalpaiguri AC Express left Howrah Junction every Tuesday and reached New Jalpaiguri the next day.
22310 New Jalpaiguri–Howrah AC Express left New Jalpaiguri every Wednesday and reached Howrah Junction the same day.

Rake sharing

The 22309 / 10 Howrah–New Jalpaiguri AC Express shared its rake with the permanently discontinued 12249 / 50 Howrah–Anand Vihar Yuva Express.

See also

Dedicated Intercity trains of India

Other trains on the Kolkata–New Jalpaiguri sector

 22301/02 Howrah–New Jalpaiguri Vande Bharat Express
 12041/42 New Jalpaiguri–Howrah Shatabdi Express
 12343/44 Sealdah New Jalpaiguri Superfast Darjeeling Mail
 12377/78 Sealdah New Alipurduar Padatik Superfast Express
 13149/50 Sealdah Alipurduar Kanchan Kanya Express
 15959/60 Dibrugarh Howrah Kamrup Express
 13175/76 Sealdah Silchar/Agartala Kanchanjunga Express
 12345/46 Guwahati Howrah Saraighat Super-fast Express
 15722/23 New Jalpaiguri Digha Paharia Express
 12518/19 Kolkata–Guwahati Garib Rath Express
 12526/27 Dibrugarh–Kolkata Superfast Express
 13141/42 Teesta Torsha Express
 13147/58 Uttar Banga Express
 12503/04 Bangalore Cantonment–Agartala Humsafar Express
 13181/82 Kolkata–Silghat Town Kaziranga Express
 22511/12 Lokmanya Tilak Terminus–Kamakhya Karmabhoomi Express
 12526/27 Dibrugarh–Kolkata Superfast Express
 15644/45 Puri–Kamakhya Weekly Express (via Howrah)
 12364/65 Kolkata–Haldibari Intercity Express
 12509/10 Guwahati–Bengaluru Cantt. Superfast Express
 12507/08 Thiruvananthapuram–Silchar Superfast Express
 12514/15 Guwahati–Secunderabad Express

References

External links

Trains from Howrah Junction railway station
Rail transport in Howrah
Transport in Jalpaiguri
Rail transport in West Bengal
Transport in Siliguri
Rail transport in Bihar
AC Express (Indian Railways) trains